High Rocks is a mountain in Greene County, New York. It is located in the Catskill Mountains north-northwest of Coxsackie. Lampman Hill is located south-southeast, and Potic Mountain is located southwest of High Rocks.

References

Mountains of Greene County, New York
Mountains of New York (state)